Booker T. Washington "Bukka" White (November 12, 1906 February 26, 1977) was an American Delta blues guitarist and singer.

Biography
White was born south of Houston, Mississippi. He was a first cousin of B.B. King's mother (White's mother and King's grandmother were sisters).

Bukka is a phonetic spelling of White's first name; he was named after the African-American educator and civil rights activist Booker T. Washington.

He played National resonator guitars, typically with a slide, in an open tuning. He was one of the few, along with Skip James, to use a crossnote tuning in E minor, which he may have learned, as James did, from Henry Stuckey. He also played piano, but less adeptly.

White started his career playing the fiddle at square dances. He claimed to have met Charley Patton soon after, but some have doubted this recollection. Nonetheless, Patton was a strong influence on White. "I wants to come to be a great man like Charlie Patton", White told his friends.

He first recorded for Victor Records in 1930. His recordings for Victor, like those of many other bluesmen, included country blues and gospel music. Victor published his photograph in 1930. His gospel songs were done in the style of Blind Willie Johnson, with a female singer accentuating the last phrase of each line.  From fourteen recordings, Victor released two records under the name Washington White, two gospel songs with Memphis Minnie on backing vocals and two country blues.

Nine years later, while serving time for assault, he recorded for the folklorist John Lomax.  The few songs he recorded around this time became his most well known: "Shake 'Em On Down" and "Po' Boy". His 1937 version of the oft-recorded song "Shake 'Em on Down" is considered definitive; it became a hit while White was serving time in Mississippi State Penitentiary, commonly known as Parchman Farm.  He wrote about his experience there in "Parchman Farm Blues", which was released in 1940.

He served in the US Navy from 1942 to 1944, after which he settled in Memphis, Tennessee, and worked outside music. Bob Dylan covered his song "Fixin' to Die Blues", which aided a "rediscovery" of White in 1963 by guitarist John Fahey and Ed Denson, which propelled him into the folk music revival of the 1960s. White had recorded the song simply because his other songs had not particularly impressed the Victor record producer. It was a studio composition of which White had thought little until it re-emerged thirty years later.

Fahey and Denson found White easily enough: Fahey wrote a letter to White and addressed it to "Bukka White (Old Blues Singer), c/o General Delivery, Aberdeen, Mississippi"—presuming, given White's song "Aberdeen, Mississippi", that White still lived there or nearby. The postcard was forwarded to Memphis, where White worked in a tank factory. Fahey and Denson soon traveled there to meet him, and White and Fahey remained friends for the rest of White's life. He recorded a new album for Denson and Fahey's Takoma Records, and Denson became his manager. White was at one time also managed by Arne Brogger, an experienced manager of blues musicians.

Later in his life, White was friends with musician Furry Lewis. The two were recorded (mostly in Lewis's Memphis apartment) by Bob West for an album, Furry Lewis, Bukka White & Friends: Party! At Home, released on the Arcola label.

White died of cancer in February 1977, at the age of 70, in Memphis, Tennessee.

In 1990 he was posthumously inducted into the Blues Hall of Fame (along with Blind Blake and Lonnie Johnson). On November 21, 2011, the Recording Academy announced the addition of "Fixin' to Die Blues" to its 2012 list of Grammy Hall of Fame Award recipients.

Legacy
The Led Zeppelin song "Hats Off to (Roy) Harper", on the band's 1970 album Led Zeppelin III, was based in large part on White's "Shake 'Em on Down". "Custard Pie", a song on their 1975 album Physical Graffiti, also references "Shake 'Em on Down."

White's 1963 recordings of "Shake 'Em on Down" and spoken-word piece "Remembrance of Charlie Patton" were both sampled by electronic artist Recoil (mostly a one-man effort by Alan Wilder of Depeche Mode) for the track "Electro Blues for Bukka White" on the 1992 album Bloodline. The song was reworked and re-released on the 2000 EP Jezebel.

In 1995, White's "Aberdeen, Mississippi" was covered as "Aberdeen" by guitarist Kenny Wayne Shepherd on his debut album, Ledbetter Heights. It reached number 23 on the Billboard (North America) Mainstream Rock Tracks in 1996.

On January 26, 2010, Eric Bibb released Booker's Guitar (TEL 31756 02) through Telarc International Corporation, after becoming inspired by the hidden stories Bibb felt by holding White's famous guitar.

White's song "Parchman Farm Blues" was recorded by Jeff Buckley, and was released posthumously on the bonus disc of Buckley's album Grace: Legacy Edition.

In 2011, White was honored with a marker on the Mississippi Blues Trail in Houston, Mississippi.

The Bukka White Blues Festival is an annual music festival on Columbus Day Weekend in Aberdeen, Mississippi.

The University Press of Mississippi is scheduled to publish the first full-length biography of Booker White in early 2024.

Discography

Studio albums
Mississippi Blues (Takoma, 1964)
Sky Songs (Vol. 1 & 2) (Arhoolie Records, 1965)
Memphis Hot Shots (Blue Horizon, 1968)
Big Daddy (Biograph Records, 1974)

Live album
Country Blues (Sparkasse in Concert, 1975)

Compilation albums
Parchman Farm 1937–1940 (Columbia, 1969)
Baton Rouge Mosby Street (Blues Beacon, 1982)
Aberdeen Mississippi Blues 1937–1940 (Travelin' Man, 1985)
Parchman Farm Blues (Orbis Records, 1992)
Shake' Em on Down (New Rose, 1993)
The Complete Bukka White 1937–1940 (Columbia, 1994)
1963 Isn't 1962 (Adelphi, 1994)
Good Gin Blues (Drive, 1995)
Shake 'Em on Down (Catfish, 1998)
The Panama Limited (ABM, 2000)
Revisited (Fuel, 2003)
Aberdeen Mississippi Blues: The Vintage Recordings 1930–1940 (Document, 2003)
Mississippi Blues Giant (EPM, 2003)
Fixin' to Die (Snapper, 2004)
Parchman Farm Blues (Roots, 2004)
Aberdeen, Mississippi Blues (Sunset Blvd Records, 2019)

References

1906 births
1977 deaths
African-American guitarists
American blues guitarists
American male guitarists
American blues pianists
American male pianists
American blues singers
American country singer-songwriters
Country blues singers
American street performers
Blues musicians from Mississippi
Blues revival musicians
Country blues musicians
Delta blues musicians
Gospel blues musicians
Singer-songwriters from Mississippi
People from Aberdeen, Mississippi
People from Houston, Mississippi
Musicians from Memphis, Tennessee
Resonator guitarists
Slide guitarists
Vocalion Records artists
Deaths from cancer in Tennessee
20th-century American guitarists
Singer-songwriters from Tennessee
20th-century American pianists
Guitarists from Mississippi
Guitarists from Tennessee
Country musicians from Tennessee
Country musicians from Mississippi
Arhoolie Records artists
Mississippi Blues Trail
African-American male singer-songwriters
African-American pianists
20th-century African-American male singers